Rodney Earl Slater (born February 23, 1955) is an American politician of the Democratic Party who served as the United States Secretary of Transportation under President Bill Clinton from 1997 to 2001. Prior to being appointed to the Clinton Cabinet, Slater served as the administrator of the Federal Highway Administration from 1993 to 1997.

Education
Slater graduated from Eastern Michigan University in 1977, and received his Juris Doctor degree from the University of Arkansas School of Law in 1980.

Early career
Slater became a research assistant to the State Judiciary Committee of the Arkansas Constitutional Convention in 1979–80, an assistant attorney general for the state of Arkansas in 1980. He was appointed to several state government positions in Arkansas by Bill Clinton. Positions included assistant to the governor between 1983 and 1987, and member of the Arkansas State Highway Commission between 1987 and 1993. Slater was also the director of governmental affairs for Arkansas State University during that time.

Appointment to federal positions

After Clinton was elected president, 1993 Slater became the first African-American Director of the Federal Highway Administration.

In 1997, Slater was appointed to be the Secretary of Transportation. He was the second African American to hold that post.

Projects
Slater was able to muster bipartisan support in congress for his projects including:
 Transportation Equity Act for the 21st Century (TEA-21), making a record $200 billion investment in surface transportation.
 Wendell H. Ford Aviation Investment Reform Act for the 21st Century (AIR-21), which provides a record $46 billion to provide safety and security of the nation's aviation system
Negotiated of 40 Open skies agreements with other countries

Private sector
Slater is part of a group of investors headed by Stan Kasten that successfully purchased the Major League Baseball team, the Washington Nationals.

Slater is a partner at the Washington, D.C. law firm of Squire Patton Boggs, where he is head of the transportation practice and works on projects related to the transportation infrastructure. He is also a partner in James Lee Witt Associates, a risk management firm headed by former Federal Emergency Management Agency director James Lee Witt.

He serves on the board of directors of Africare, a nonprofit providing development aid to countries in Africa, and The Dance Theater of Harlem, and is the chair of the Board of Trustees of United Way. Slater also serves on the corporate boards of Delta Air Lines and Verizon. He has been appointed to join the board of WS Atkins as a non-executive director effective 9 September 2011.

As of December 3, 2014 Slater was appointed to serve as special counsel to Takata Corporation in support of Takata's dealings on the 2013 airbag recall issues they are facing. They will advise the Company as they address the current challenges Takata faces. He also led a safety advisory panel for Toyota and served as independent monitor for Fiat Chrysler Automobiles.

See also
List of African-American United States Cabinet members

References

External links
Profile at Squire Patton Boggs

1955 births
20th-century American politicians
Administrators of the Federal Highway Administration
African-American members of the Cabinet of the United States
Arkansas lawyers
Arkansas State University faculty
Clinton administration cabinet members
Delta Air Lines people
Eastern Michigan University alumni
Lawyers from Washington, D.C.
Living people
People from Marianna, Arkansas
United States Secretaries of Transportation
University of Arkansas School of Law alumni
Verizon Communications people
Members of the Arkansas State Highway Commission
Clinton administration personnel
People associated with Squire Patton Boggs